Jomoul Anthony Francois (born 4 September 1995) is a Trinidadian footballer who plays as a midfielder, winger or forward for Druk Lhayul FC.

Career

In 2019, Francois signed for Trinidadian side Rangers (La Horquetta). Before the second half of 2019–20, he signed for Independiente (El Salvador) in El Salvador. In 2021, he signed for Nepalese club Friends Club. Francois was top scorer of the 2021–22 Martyr's Memorial A-Division League with 7 goals.

In 2022, he signed for Druk Lhayul FC in Bhutan.

References

External links

 

1995 births
Association football forwards
Association football midfielders
Association football wingers
Expatriate footballers in Bhutan
Expatriate footballers in El Salvador
Expatriate footballers in Nepal
Living people
North East Stars F.C. players
Salvadoran Primera División players
San Juan Jabloteh F.C. players
Trinidad and Tobago expatriate footballers
Trinidad and Tobago expatriate sportspeople in El Salvador
Trinidad and Tobago footballers
Trinidad and Tobago international footballers
TT Pro League players